Brahmanpada is a village in the western parts of Odisha in India. It is a medium sized village in Sinapali Tehsil, in the southern part of Nuapada district. Distance from the district Headquarter Nuapada to Brahmanpada is nearly about 100 km, while the place is much closer to the Chhattisgarh state border which is just 5 km away. The village has local alternative spellings as Bamhanpada & Bahmanpara.

Demographics 
According to the 2011 census of India, Brahmanpada has 323 households. The effective literacy rate (i.e. the literacy rate of population excluding children aged 6 and below) is 56%.

References 

Villages in Nuapada district